This is a statistical synopsis of the curling tournaments at the 2014 Winter Olympics.

A total of thirty-three curlers are Olympic veterans. Two female curlers from the inaugural Olympic curling event in Nagano in 1998 returned to the Olympics. Seven female curlers and one male curler who competed in Salt Lake City in 2002 have qualified again. Ten curlers from the Torino Olympics in 2006 are competing at these Olympics, and fifteen women and eighteen men who participated in the 2010 Vancouver Olympics have returned.

Percentages
In curling, each player is graded on their shots on a scale of zero to four. Their cumulative point total is then marked as a percentage out of the total points possible. This score is just for statistical purposes, and has nothing to do with the outcome of the game.

Men's tournament
Percentages by draw.

Leads

Seconds

Thirds

Fourths

Team totals

Women's tournament
Percentages by draw.

Leads

Seconds

Thirds

Fourths

Team totals

References
Men's statistics
Women's statistics

Statistics